Ingela Nilsson is a Professor of Greek at Uppsala University in Sweden, specializing in Byzantine literature and narratology.

Career 
In 2001, Nilsson received her Ph.D. at the University of Gothenburg. She was a postdoctoral researcher at the Freie Universität Berlin 2002-04, and started working as an assistant professor at Uppsala University in 2004. In 2006-2010, she was a Pro futura fellow at the Swedish Collegium for Advanced Study, and in 2007 she became an Associate Professor there.

In 2010, she became a Professor of Greek at Uppsala University. From 2016 to 2017, she was also an adjunct professor at the University of Oslo in the Department of Philosophy, Classics, History of Art and Ideas. Since the beginning of 2019, she has been the director of the Swedish Research Institute in Istanbul, a position she will hold until the end of 2021.

Research 
Nilsson’s fields of scholarship include Greek literature, Byzantine literature, and narratology. Her research focuses on the  “links between ancient and Byzantine literature as considered from narratological and transtextual points of view (especially in the twelfth century), the relation between word and image in Byzantium, historiographical writing and fictional strategies, and the image of Byzantium in post-Byzantine Europe.”  In 2020, a research group led by Nilsson received funding for an eight-year project investigating narratives in several 11th-century cultures. In 2021, she stated that her research has concerned "primarily ancient paradoxography and medieval romances.”

Awards 
 2002 - 2003 Postdoctoral fellowship from Wenner-Gren Foundations: Freie Universität Berlin
 2003 - 2004 Postdoctoral fellowship from Alexander von Humboldt Stiftung: Freie Universität Berlin
 2006 - 2010 Pro Futura II Fellow, Swedish Collegium for Advanced Study and RJ
 2008 - 2009 Grant from STINT: visiting researcher at Centre d’études byzantines, École des Hautes Études en Sciences Sociales, Paris
 2014 Grant from Hilda Kumlins stiftelse: visiting researcher at Österreichische Akademie der Wissenschaften, Vienna

Books 
 Satire in the Middle Byzantine Period: The Golden Age of Laughter (Leiden: Brill, 2021)

Writer and Occasion in Twelfth-Century Byzantium. Cambridge University Press, 2020. 
 Reading the Late Byzantine Romance. Cambridge University press, 2018. 
Raconter Byzance: la littérature au XIIe siècle (Paris: Belles Lettres, 2014)
Plotting with Eros : essays on the poetics of love and the erotics of reading (Copenhagen: Museum Tusculanum Press, 2009)

External links 

 Talk, 'Writer and Occasion in Twelfth-Century Byzantium. The Authorial Voice of Constantine Manasses': https://www.youtube.com/watch?v=EB98pfMPsPw

References 

Year of birth missing (living people)
Living people
Place of birth missing (living people)
Academic staff of Uppsala University
University of Gothenburg alumni
Academic staff of the University of Oslo
Women Byzantinists
Swedish Byzantinists
Scholars of Byzantine literature